The Ginkgoaceae is a family of gymnosperms which appeared during the Mesozoic Era, of which the only extant representative is Ginkgo biloba, which is for this reason sometimes regarded as a living fossil. Formerly, however, there were several other genera, and forests of ginkgo existed. Because leaves can take such diverse forms within a single species, these are a poor measure of diversity, although differing structures of wood point to the existence of diverse ginkgo forests in ancient times.

References

External links
 
 
 
 

.
Plant families
Jurassic plants
Extant Jurassic first appearances